The Michigan PGA Championship is a golf tournament that is the section championship of the Michigan section of the PGA of America. It has been played annually since 1922 at a variety of courses around the state.

The 2018 event was noticeable for a nearly-forgotten rule that a participant must have 60 days of membership in the Michigan PGA. Ben Cook had the lowest score and received first place money, but Lee Houtteman was awarded the win and an exemption to the first Rocket Mortgage Classic. Cook was still eligible for entry into the PGA Professional Championship.

Winners

2022 Kyle Martin
2021 Ben Cook
2020 Ben Cook
2019 Jeff Roth
2018 Lee Houtteman / Ben Cook
2017 John Seltzer III
2016 Scott Hebert
2015 Dan Urban
2014 Scott Hebert
2013 Brian Cairns
2012 Scott Hebert
2011 Scott Hebert
2010 Ron Beurman
2009 Scott Hebert
2008 Scott Hebert
2007 Scott Hebert
2006 Scott Hebert
2005 John DalCorobbo
2004 Joe Pollack
2003 Jeff Roth
2002 Ken Allard
2001 Jeff Roth
2000 Brian Cairns
1999 Jeff Roth
1998 Jeff Roth
1997 Tom Harding
1996 Brian Cairns
1995 Steve Brady
1994 Bob Makoski
1993 Steve Brady
1992 Barry Redmond
1991 Ken Allard
1990 Barry Redmond
1989 Ken Allard
1988 Jack Seltzer
1987 Lynn Janson
1986 Gary Robinson
1985 Lynn Janson
1984 John Traub
1983 Buddy Whitten
1982 Tom Doozan
1981 Lynn Janson
1980 Al Mengart
1979 Lynn Janson
1978 Randy Erskine
1977 Buddy Whitten
1976 Al Mengert
1975 Gene Bone
1974 Ron Aleks
1973 Glenn Stuart
1972 Larry Mancour
1971 John Molenda
1970 Dick Bury
1969 Glenn Stuart
1968 Mike Souchak
1967 Tom Deaton
1966 Gene Bone
1965 Brien C. Charter
1964 Ted Kroll
1963 Dick Bury
1962 Ben Lula
1961 John Barnum
1960 Ron Fox
1959 Chick Harbert
1958 John Barnum
1957 John Barnum
1956 Jim Johnson
1955 Walter Burkemo
1954 Al Watrous
1953 Chick Harbert
1952 Al Watrous
1951 Ed Furgol
1950 Chick Harbert
1949 Chick Harbert
1948 Horton Smith
1947 Chick Harbert
1946 Chick Harbert
1945 Sam Byrd
1944 Sam Byrd
1943 Jimmy Demaret
1942 Marvin Stahl
1941 Al Watrous
1940 Em Kocsis
1939 Al Watrous
1938 Al Watrous
1937 Joe Belfore
1936 Al Watrous
1935 Charles Sommers
1934 Mortie Dutra
1933 Joe Belfore
1932 Al Watrous
1931 Walter Hagen
1930 Walter Hagen
1929 Clarence Gamber
1928 Em Kocsis
1927 James Kinnear
1926 Wilfrid Reid
1925 Frank Sprogell
1924 Al Watrous
1923 Dave Robertson
1922 Al Watrous

References

External links
PGA of America – Michigan section
List of winners

Golf in Michigan
PGA of America sectional tournaments
Recurring sporting events established in 1922
1922 establishments in Michigan